is Akinori Nakagawa's fifth single, released in 2005. The single was written by Mekete. It aired on the intersital music program Minna no Uta on TV from August 2005 to September 2005 on NHK. The animation was created by Kunio Katō who is the winner of the 2009 Academy Award for Best Animated Short Film at the 81st Academy Awards.

Track listing

External links
Official Discography 
JBOOK DATA

References

2005 singles
2005 songs
Akinori Nakagawa songs
Animated music videos
Minna no Uta